Dilettanten-Theaterverein 1812 Kremsmünster is a theatre located in the town of Kremsmünster in Kirchdorf an der Krems (district), in Upper Austria, Austria.

References

External links

 (in German)
Dilettanten-Theater-Verein 1812 at kremsmuenster.at (in German)

Theatres in Austria